Brenda Heller (born August 19, 1963) is an American politician who served in the North Dakota House of Representatives from the 33rd district from 2006 to 2014.

References

1963 births
Living people
Republican Party members of the North Dakota House of Representatives